Mowbray Henry Gordon Howard, 6th Earl of Effingham (29 November 1905 – 22 February 1996), styled Lord Howard from 1927 to 1946, was a British peer.

He was born on 29 November 1905 to Gordon Howard, 5th Earl of Effingham, and Rosamond Margaret Hudson.  He was educated at Lancing College.

In October 1932, Howard was charged with manslaughter after an inquest found that he had knocked down an agricultural labourer in his car. However, the case was dismissed when it came to the magistrates' court at Maidenhead.

He served in the Royal Artillery during the Second World War, succeeding his father as Earl of Effingham on 7 July 1946.

His first wife, Hungarian-born Maria Malvina Gertler, was under suspicion by MI5, and in fact was interned for three months in 1941 on the grounds that she was involved in the "preparation of acts prejudicial to the public safety or the defence of the realm" and held in Holloway prison. They were divorced in 1946.

In 1952 he married Gladys Irene Freeman; they were divorced in 1971. His third wife was (Mabel) Suzanne Mingay Le Pen (1919–2008), whom he married in 1972. He had no children and was succeeded by his nephew David Howard.

In return for £10 per week, Effingham agreed to serve on the board of Esmeralda's Barn, the gambling club operated by the Kray twins in the early 1960s.

References and sources
References

Sources
thepeerage.com Mowbray Howard, 6th Earl of Effingham

External links

1905 births
1996 deaths
Royal Artillery officers
Earls in the Peerage of the United Kingdom
Mowbray Howard, 6th Earl of Effingham
People educated at Lancing College
Earls of Effingham
People acquitted of manslaughter
British Army personnel of World War II
Barons Howard of Effingham